Who Needs Pictures is the debut studio album by American country music artist Brad Paisley. Released on June 1, 1999 on Arista Nashville, it features four singles, all of which were hits on the Billboard country music charts. In order of release, these were "Who Needs Pictures", "He Didn't Have to Be" (his first No. 1), "Me Neither", and "We Danced" (also a No. 1). The album has been certified platinum by the RIAA.

This album was repackaged with Part II by Sony's Legacy division and released on September 23, 2008.

Track listing

Personnel 
 Brad Paisley – lead vocals, electric guitars, acoustic guitar, six string bass
 Bernie Herms – acoustic piano, Rhodes piano, Hammond B3 organ, strings
 Tim Lauer – accordion
 Glen Duncan – mandolin, fiddle
 Frank Rogers – banjo
 Mike Johnson – steel guitar, dobro, pedabro (13)
 Earl Clark – steel guitar (11)
 James Gregory – bass 
 Eddie Bayers – drums (1-3, 5, 9)
 Mitch McMichen – drums (6-8, 10, 12), percussion (6-8, 10, 12)
 Wes Hightower – backing vocals
 Steve Williams – "absolutely nothing"

Production 
 Frank Rogers – producer, additional overdub recording
 John Kelton – recording (1-4, 6-9, 11, 12, 13), mixing (1, 2, 3, 9)
 Greg Droman – recording (5, 10)
 Richard Barrow – mixing (2, 4-8, 10-13)
 Paula Montonado – recording assistant (1-4, 6-9, 11, 12, 13), mix assistant (1, 2, 3, 5-13)
 Mike Purcell – mix assistant (2, 4-8, 10-13), recording assistant (5, 10)
 Rich Hanson – mix assistant (4)
 Brian David Willis – overdub recording, digital editing 
 Nathan DiGesare – additional overdub recording
 Chris Latham – additional overdub recording
 Hank Williams – mastering 
 Susan Sherrill – production assistant 
 S. Wade Hunt – art direction, design 
 Jim "Señor" McGuire – photography
 Mixed at The Castle (Franklin, TN) and Loud Recording (Nashville, TN).
 Mastered at MasterMix (Nashville, TN).

Chart performance

Weekly charts

Year-end charts

Certifications

References

1999 debut albums
Brad Paisley albums
Arista Records albums
Albums produced by Frank Rogers (record producer)